Portendick is an abandoned coastal city in western Mauritania. It was located in the Ouad Naga Department of Trarza Region. During the 17th and 18th centuries, Portendick had a significant port for the gum arabic trade; however, by the 19th century trade from the port became unsustainable due to the area's arid, desert climate and lack of drinking water. As of 1916, all that remained of the city was a small group of huts.

References

Former populated places in Mauritania
Trarza Region